Noricella oreinos is a species of small, air-breathing land snail, a terrestrial pulmonate gastropod mollusk in the family Hygromiidae, the hairy snails and their allies. This species is endemic to Austria.

This hairy-shelled snail was once confused with Trochulus hispidus, which it superficially resembles and therefore assigned to the genus Trochulus. Later on was moved to an own Genus Noricella. Its former subspecies Noricella oreinos scheerpeltzi was elevated to species level  and therefore the Genus Noricella consists of two species now.

Taxonomy
Noricella oreinos comprised originally two subspecies: N. o. oreinos (Wagner, 1915) in Lower Austria and Styria and N. o. scheerpeltzi (Mikula, 1954) in Upper Austria.
Both taxa were originally described as regional subspecies of Trochulus hispidus. Later these two subspecies were split from Trochulus hispidus and placed in a separate species because of differences in hair morphology.
Current comprehensive research, based on molecular, morphological and ecological analyses, confirm this split from T. hispidus. Additionally it was already pointed out that both taxa represent separated mitochondrial lines and different internal genital morphology although there do exist intermediate forms concerning shell morphology. A more detailed genetical study confirmed that there was almost no gene flow between the two taxa, not even in regions were they coexist, which justifies the split into separate species.

Description
Noricella oreinos can be separated from other representatives of the tribe Trochulini by its small, curled hairs, which have a length of 0.03–0.09 mm. Like the other representatives of this tribe, older individuals and empty shells have often lost the hairs on the shell.

Other marks are irregular, coarse ridges on the shell and an internal rib with a basal tooth in the peristome, visible as yellow structure from the outside.

The shell of the sister species  N. o. scheerpeltzi is characterized by a groove beneath the keel, but there are intermediate forms between the two taxa with an incomplete or weakly developed groove.

While the gross anatomy of the reproductive system is similar to that of the genus Trochulus and its congener N. scheerpeltzi, Noricella oreinos can be unambiguously differentiated by the internal fold pattern of the penis.

Habitat and distribution
Noricella oreinos inhabits primarily boulders, screes and alpine grassland, especially alpine meadows with patchy vegetation coverage, dominated by the sedge species Carex firma, in the Northern Calcareous Alps. The distribution range reaches from Schneeberg mountain in Lower Austria to Totes Gebirge in Upper Austria. Like the helicid snail Cylindrus obtusus, this species is suspected to be an ancient native East-alpine endemic, which survived the glacial times on ice-free parts of the north-eastern alpine margins.

References

External links 
 Trochulus oreinos at AnimalBase

Hygromiidae
Fauna of Austria
Gastropods described in 1915
Endemic fauna of Austria
Taxonomy articles created by Polbot
Taxobox binomials not recognized by IUCN